St John the Baptist School is a coeducational Catholic secondary school and sixth form in Woking, Surrey, England. The school was one of the first 100 designated teaching schools in the UK.

Location
The school serves primarily the Catholic community of the Woking Deanery, which comprises the parishes of Woking with Send, Camberley, Camberley North with Bagshot, Frimley, Knaphill and West Byfleet. The deanery primary schools located in that community which are the feeder schools for St John the Baptist School are: St Dunstan’s Primary School, Woking; St Augustine’s Primary School, St Mary's Byfleet, Camberley; St Hugh of Lincoln Catholic Primary School, Knaphill and The Marist Primary School, West Byfleet.

National teaching school
SJB was designated a teaching school in July 2011. There are currently ten members of staff seconded to other schools and under the leadership of Ani Magill, 16 senior leaders have become head teachers. 
 
As a national teaching School they offer training and support to:
 Play a greater role in training new entrants to the profession
 Lead peer-to-peer professional and leadership development
 Identify and develop leadership potential
 Provide support for other schools
 Designate and broker Specialist Leaders of Education (SLEs)
 Engage in research and development

In conjunction with The Surrey Teaching Schools Network, SJB has been successful in securing the licence for leadership provision of the National College for School Leadership's programmes. As a teaching school, St John the Baptist School is responsible for the NPQH.

Academy
Previously a voluntary aided school administered by the Surrey County Council, St. John the Baptist School converted to academy status in September 2016. The school is now sponsored by the Xavier Catholic Education Trust.

Academics
In 2010, the A Level results were 100% pass with 71% at A*-B.

The GCSE results were 97.4% of students achieved 5 or more GCSEs at grade C or above (89.4% including English and Maths). 51% of grades were A* and A putting the school at 128 in the Daily Mail rankings. However, this is a non-selective school so the comparisons may be questioned as many of the schools higher in the table select on ability.

Truancy (unauthorised absence) is below the national average at 0.30%. The Surrey average is higher at 1.0%; whilst the national average is 1.1%

Notable former pupils 
 Claire Darke, 161st Mayor of Wolverhampton
 Sean Lock, English comedian
 Ali-A, famous YouTuber

References

External links
 Official school website

Catholic secondary schools in the Diocese of Arundel and Brighton
Academies in Surrey
Educational institutions established in 1971
Secondary schools in Surrey